The Sheriff of Auchterarder was historically the office responsible for enforcing law and order in Auchterarder, Scotland and bringing criminals to justice.

Sheriffs of Auchterarder

Malcolm de Inverpefer (1304-1305)

References
Reid, Alexander George. Annals of Auchterarder and Memorials of Srathearn (1899)

Sheriff courts
Auchterarder